Nymphaea violacea, also known as blue lily, is a waterlily in the genus Nymphaea.

Distribution 
Nymphaea violacea is found in Australia, particularly in the Western Australian Kimberley region and in northern parts of Queensland and the Northern Territory.

Description 
The flowers are violet, blue or white.

Uses 
The waterlily is a bush tucker of the Aboriginal people in northern Australia. The tuber, stem, flowers and seeds are all edible.

Like other species in the genus, the plant contains the psychoactive alkaloid aporphine, which provide sedative effects when ingested.

See also

 List of plants known as lily

References 

violacea
Flora of Western Australia
Flora of Queensland
Flora of the Northern Territory